FIBA Order of Merit is an international basketball award that is awarded by FIBA, the international basketball federation. The award is given to individuals that have made very significant individual contributions to furthering the sport of basketball. The award was first established in July 1994.

Recipients

See also
Olympic Order
FIBA Hall of Fame
 List of members of the FIBA Hall of Fame
FIBA's 50 Greatest Players
FIBA Europe Player of the Year
FIBA Europe Young Men's Player of the Year
Radomir Šaper Prize
FIBA Silver Plate

Notes
FIBA.com Internal Regulations of the International Basketball Federation (FIBA) 2010.
FIBA.com Internal Regulations of the International Basketball Federation (FIBA) 2006.

References

External links
Official FIBA Website

Basketball trophies and awards
Order of Merit